Life Beyond the Box: Margo Leadbetter is a 2003 BBC Television comedy docudrama telling the life of Margo Leadbetter, a character from 1975 BBC TV series The Good Life.

Synopsis
The film describes Margo's life since The Good Life finished. Unlike the earlier Life Beyond the Box: Norman Stanley Fletcher, most of the actors, except Moyra Fraser, from the original series did not take part and appear only in archive footage.

The film also includes celebrity cameos from  Richard and Judy, Max Clifford, Raj Persaud, John Sergeant and Judith Chalmers.

Cast
Rita Tushingham as Celia Fishwick
Moyra Fraser as Felicity
Claire Carroll as Margo Leadbetter
Joanna Eliot as Young Margo
Max Bollinger as Charles Allcock

External links 
 

BBC television docudramas
2003 television specials